American musician Stevie Wonder has released 23 studio albums, three soundtrack albums, four live albums, 11 compilations, one box set, and 91 
singles. His first album, The Jazz Soul of Little Stevie, was released in 1962 when he was 12 years old, and his most recent, A Time to Love, was released in 2005.

Wonder has had ten US number-one hits on the pop charts, as well as 20 R&B number one hits, and has sold over 100 million records, 19.5 million of which are albums; he is one of the top 60 best-selling music artists with combined sales of singles and albums.

Wonder has 30 main album releases, all of which are single albums, apart from Songs in the Key of Life, which was released as a double album with a bonus four track EP.

There are 11 official compilation albums; in addition, a box set, The Complete Stevie Wonder, was released in 2005. Wonder is eighth on the list of artists with the most number-ones on the US Billboard Hot 100.

Albums

Studio, live and soundtrack albums

Compilation albums

Singles

1962–1969

1970–1979

1980–1989

1990–present

Notes

Other appearances

Guest appearances

Production 
Albums

Tracks

References

External links

Discographies of American artists
Rhythm and blues discographies
Pop music discographies
Rock music discographies
Discography
Soul music discographies